Kim Yong-sik (Hanja: 金容植; 25 July 1910 – 8 March 1985) was a South Korean football player and manager. He is esteemed as the godfather of the South Korean football.

International career
Kim played international football for both Japan and South Korea. When Korea was ruled by Japan, Kim was the only Korean footballer to be selected for the Japanese national team for the Summer Olympics. He contributed to Japan's victory by assisting the winning goal in the first round of the 1936 Summer Olympics against Sweden. After the Olympics, Kim joined Waseda University which had many Japan's national players, but he went back to Korea because of the discrimination about Koreans.

Kim could participate in the Olympics as a Korean player after the end of the Japanese occupation. He achieved the first-ever victory of South Korean football against Mexico as a player-coach in the 1948 Summer Olympics.

Style of play
Kim had fast pace, elaborate techniques, and high workrate which most footballers need. Japan also couldn't ignore his abilities, selecting him for the Japanese national team. He played as a centre-half, but he was a playmaker who took part in the attack.

Managerial career
Kim managed South Korean national team in the 1954 FIFA World Cup and the 1960 AFC Asian Cup after his retirement.

Personal life
Kim was diligent and only absorbed in the football. He extremely avoided harmful things to human body, and had ardor for training. His healthy habit made him continue his playing career until the age of forty.

Career statistics

International

Managerial statistics

Honours

Player
Soongsil College
All Joseon Football Tournament: 1931

Kyungsung FC
All Joseon Football Tournament: 1936
Emperor's Cup: 1935
Chōsen Shrine Games: 1935
Meiji Shrine Games: 1935

Joseon Electrical Industry
Korean National Championship: 1949

Individual
Korean FA Hall of Fame: 2005

Manager
South Korea
AFC Asian Cup: 1960

Yangzee
Korean National Championship: 1968
Asian Champion Club Tournament runner-up: 1969

References

External links
 
 Japan National Football Team Database

1910 births
1985 deaths
Japanese footballers
South Korean footballers
Japan international footballers
South Korea international footballers
Kyungsung FC players
Pyongyang FC players
Olympic footballers of Japan
Footballers at the 1936 Summer Olympics
Olympic footballers of South Korea
Footballers at the 1948 Summer Olympics
Dual internationalists (football)
South Korean football managers
South Korea national football team managers
1954 FIFA World Cup managers
South Korean football referees
Zainichi Korean people
Association football midfielders